Griffith Thomas (1820—1879) was an American architect. He partnered with his father, Thomas Thomas, at the architecture firm of T. Thomas and Son.

Architecture writer Christopher Gray called him "one of the most prolific architects of the period" (the mid-19th century). The American Institute of Architects in 1908 called him "the most fashionable architect of his generation." Many of his notable buildings are found in New York City.

Griffith Thomas was interred at Green-Wood Cemetery, in Brooklyn, New York in 1879. His own marble monument is simple in comparison to the ornate structures he built during his lifetime.

Selected works

St. Nicholas Hotel (1853), 507-27 Broadway, demolished. 1,000 guest rooms.
Fifth Avenue Hotel (1859), 200 Fifth Avenue (23rd to 24th Streets), demolished. Replaced by Robert Maynicke's Toy Center Building, 1909.
Astor Library (1859 expansion), 444 Lafayette Street. Now the center section of The Public Theater.
Mortimer Building (1862), 935-939 Broadway (159 Fifth Avenue) Flatiron House. Now Restoration Hardware Building . 
National Park Bank Building (1868, altered 1905), 214-18 Broadway, demolished 1961
Pike's Opera House (1868), 8th Avenue & 23rd Street, later renamed the Grand Opera House, demolished 1960.
Arnold Constable Building (1869), Broadway & West 19th Street
New York Life Insurance Building (1870), 346 Broadway. Altered and expanded by McKim, Mead & White, 1904.
12 East 53rd Street (1872). Altered by Raleigh C. Gildersleeve, 1906.
Gunther Building (1872), 469-75 Broome Street, cast-iron facade.
Hotel Bristol (1875), 42nd Street and Fifth Avenue, New York City, for the former shipbuilder and financier William H. Webb, demolished.
Kimball House Hotel (1870) Entire city block between Whitehall (now Peachtree) Street, Decatur Street, Pryor Street, and Wall Street, Atlanta, [8] with William Parkins, burned 1883. 500 rooms, early use of elevators and central heating, 4-story lobby, 16 shops.

Notes

External links

 "The Gunther Building", New York Architectural Images.
 "Arnold Constable Building", by edenpictures, on Flickr.
 "The Old Astor Library, Now the Joseph Papp Public Theater", by Christopher Gray, New York Times, February 10, 2002.
 "Former New York Life Insurance Company Building", The Masterpiece Next Door, archived by Internet Archive's Wayback Machine on December 7, 2008.
 Green-Wood Cemetery Burial Search

1820 births
1879 deaths
19th-century American architects